BN Televizija or BN TV is a Bosnian commercial television channel based in Bijeljina, Bosnia and Herzegovina. BN TV is part of RTV BN television network company which was founded on 5 May 1998. It mainly broadcasts in the Serbian language using the Cyrillic alphabet. BN Televizija is a 24-hour channel with news, political and entertainment programs. RTV BN is currently the highest rated TV channel in the Republika Srpska entity and it is one of leading commercial TV channels in Bosnia and Herzegovina.

Current line-up

News program
Dnevnik - main news, sport and weather information every day at 16:00 (Dnevnik 1), 19:30 (Dnevnik 2) and around 22:30 (Dnevnik 3)
Novosti - short news, runs in 10:00, 12:00 and 14:00h
Danas u Srpskoj - (Today in Srpska) regional news from major cities of Republika Srpska (broadcast at 18:00, Monday to Friday)

Talk shows
Globalno - a political talk show dealing with "global topics from a domestic perspective" hosted by Boris Malagurski. Airs Wednesdays at 8:50 PM.
Crno na bijelo - a political talk show with guests hosted by Suzana Rađen – Todorić. Airs Tuesdays at 9:00 PM.
Puls - a political talk show with guest and various topics from BiH society. Airs Thursdays at 9:00 PM.
Granica - a talk show from Serbian TV station Happy TV.
Ćirilica - talk show with guests hosted by Milomir Marić, made by Serbian Happy TV.

Entertainment
Jutarnji program - Mosaic morning show (broadcast at 06:00, Monday to Friday)
BN koktel - folk music show with guests
Kao kod svoje kuće
Bez maske
Subotom u 3
Nedeljno popodne
Balkanske prevare - controversial reality television show from Serbian RTV Pink
Ništa lično

Foreign series/shows
Larin izbor - Croatian soap opera (Season 2 in cooperation with OBN Televizija)
Ruža vjetrova - Croatian soap opera (Season 2 in cooperation with OBN Televizija)
Veliki Brat VIP 5 - reality television show made in cooperation with OBN Televizija
Prevrtljivo srce (Hercai) - Turkish drama/romance show

See also
BN Music
BN Radio

References

External links 
Official website

Mass media in Bijeljina
Television stations in Bosnia and Herzegovina
Television channels in North Macedonia
Television channels and stations established in 1998